Tyler Reed Duncan (born July 13, 1989) is an American professional golfer.

Amateur career
Duncan played his college golf for the Purdue Boilermakers.

Professional career
Duncan played on the PGA Tour Latinoamérica in 2014 where his best finish was T-6 at the Lexus Panama Classic. In December 2014, Duncan finished in the top 45 at the Web.com Tour Qualifying Tournament earning his Web.com Tour card for 2015. He played on the Web.com Tour from 2015 to 2017. His best finish on the Web.com Tour was T-2 at the 2015 Brasil Champions and T-2 at the 2017 BMW Charity Pro-Am.

In 2017, he finished T-11 in the Web.com Tour Finals to earn his PGA Tour card for the 2017–18 season.

In November 2019, Duncan won the RSM Classic in a playoff over Webb Simpson. It was Duncan's first win in a multiple-day event since the 2011 Indiana Amateur. He did not win while playing college golf at Purdue and did not win at any level in professional golf. His win included his lowest round on tour, a second round 61.

Personal
Duncan's uncle, Andrew Johnson, is his swing coach. Johnson won the 2005 Cleveland Open on the Nationwide Tour.

Professional wins (1)

PGA Tour wins (1)

PGA Tour playoff record (1–0)

Results in major championships
Results not in chronological order in 2020.

CUT = missed the half-way cut
"T" = tied
NT = No tournament due to COVID-19 pandemic

Results in The Players Championship

CUT = missed the halfway cut
"T" indicates a tie for a place
C = Canceled after the first round due to the COVID-19 pandemic

Results in World Golf Championships

1Cancelled due to COVID-19 pandemic

NT = No tournament

See also
2017 Web.com Tour Finals graduates
2019 Korn Ferry Tour Finals graduates

References

External links
 
 

American male golfers
Purdue Boilermakers men's golfers
PGA Tour golfers
Golfers from Indiana
Golfers from Tampa, Florida
People from Columbus, Indiana
1989 births
Living people